Paracymoriza distinctalis is a moth in the family Crambidae. It was described by John Henry Leech in 1889. It is found in China (Zhejiang, Henan, Hubei, Hunan, Guangdong, Guangxi, Sichuan, Guizhou) and Taiwan.

References

Acentropinae
Moths described in 1889